Annie Antone (born 1955) is a Native American Tohono O'odham basket weaver from Gila Bend, Arizona.

Background
Annie Antone was born in Tucson, Arizona in 1955. She learned how to weave baskets from her mother, Irene Antone. Annie began at the age of 19 and sold her first basket for $10. She gave the money to her mother. Currently she lives on the Gila Bend Reservation.

Basketry
Antone only uses plant materials harvested from her homeland, the Sonoran Desert. These include yucca, devil's claw, and bear grass. Her techniques in making coiled baskets are traditional, but her designs are completely unique. She specializes in highly graphic, pictorial imagery and has featured realistic images of panthers and semi-tractor trailers. She wove a basket featuring the traditional flute player, surrounded by musical notes forming a specific song. This piece is on display in the Native American art collection of the Casino Arizona. The curator there, Aleta Rinlero says of Antone's work: "She doesn't weave baskets, she weaves concepts."

Ancient Hohokam pottery designs also provide Antone with inspiration for basket designs, as have the flora and fauna of the Sonoran Desert. To achieve her complex designs, she carefully sketches them out before weaving.

She has exhibited throughout the country, as well as the British Museum, and won awards at the Heard Museum Guild Indian Fair and Market, Red Earth, Gallup Ceremonial, the O’odham Tash Rodeo and Fair, and the Santa Fe Indian Market. She was first invited to exhibit and demonstrate basketry at the National Museum of Natural History, Smithsonian Institution in Washington, D.C. in 1992 and has been invited back by the National Museum of the American Indian many times.

See also

List of Native American artists
Visual arts by indigenous peoples of the Americas

Notes

References
Greene, Jacqueline Dembar. The Tohono O'odham. London: Franklin Watts, 1998. .
McFadden, David Revere and Ellen Napiura Taubman. Changing Hands: Art without Reservation 1: Contemporary Native North American Art from the Southwest. New York: Museum of Arts and Design, 2002. .
Wertikin, Gerard and Lee Kogan. Encyclopedia of American Folk Art. New York: Routledge, 2003. .

Native American basket weavers
1955 births
Tohono O'odham people
Living people
20th-century American women artists
Native American women artists
Women basketweavers
20th-century Native Americans
21st-century Native Americans
20th-century Native American women
21st-century Native American women
Artists from Arizona
Native American people from Arizona
People from Maricopa County, Arizona